Lotte Beate Søvre (born 8 January 1972) is a Norwegian sport wrestler. Her achievements include two bronze medals at the world championships and three times national champion.

Career
Søvre became Norwegian champion in 1987 and 1991 and 1992.

She won a bronze medal at the 1989 World Wrestling Championships in Martigny, and a bronze medal at the 1990 World Wrestling Championships in Luleå.

Personal life
Søvre was born on 8 January 1972. She grew up in Lørenskog and represented the club Lørenskog BK.

References

1972 births
Living people
Norwegian female sport wrestlers
World Wrestling Championships medalists
20th-century Norwegian women